Felix Otto may refer to:

 Felix Otto (mathematician) (born 1966), German mathematician
 Felix Otto (rower) (born  1983), German rower